Roaring Meg may refer to:

Roaring Meg (cannon), any of several large siege cannon
Mons Meg, a famous cannon at Edinburgh Castle
Roaring Meg hydro scheme, a hydroelectric scheme on the Kawarau River in New Zealand
Lower Roaring Meg power station
Upper Roaring Meg power station
Roaring Meg (Stevenage), a retail park in Stevenage, Hertfordshire, England
Roaring Meg (waterfall), a waterfall in the Daintree National Park in North Queensland, Australia
Tecomanthe burungu, also known as Roaring Meg Creek trumpet vine, a climbing plant from Queensland, Australia